Elizabeth Somerset may refer to:

 Elizabeth Herbert, Marchioness of Powis, née Lady Elizabeth Somerset
 Elizabeth Somerset, Baroness Herbert, wife of Charles Somerset, Baron Herbert
 Elizabeth Somerset, Countess of Worcester (wife of the 2nd Earl), wife of Henry Somerset, 2nd Earl of Worcester
 Elizabeth Somerset, Countess of Worcester (wife of the 4th Earl), wife of Edward Somerset, 4th Earl of Worcester
 Elizabeth Somerset, Duchess of Beaufort (née Berkeley; c.1713–1799)